Major General Simon Francis Neil Lalor, CB, TD, VR (born 1956) is a British businessman. As a Territorial Army officer, he served as Assistant Chief of the Defence Staff (Reserves and Cadets) from 2007 to 2010.

Military service 

On 6 March 1976, having graduated from the Royal Military Academy Sandhurst, Lalor was commissioned as a second lieutenant into the Queen's Regiment, British Army. He was given the service number 501631. On 6 March 1978, he was promoted to lieutenant. On 2 September 1978, he was transferred to the Regular Army Reserve of Officers thereby ending his active, full-time service.

On 3 February 1979, he transferred to the Honourable Artillery Company. He retained the rank of lieutenant and given seniority in that rank from 6 August 1978. He was promoted to captain on 16 April 1984. While an acting major, he was promoted to major on 10 March 1990 which seniority from 1 October 1987. He was promoted to lieutenant colonel on 1 October 1993, and to colonel on 1 July 1996. He was promoted to brigadier on 31 October 2002.

On 1 March 2007, he was promoted to major general and appointed Assistant Chief of the Defence Staff.

Career 
In 1998, he became a director of Britam Defence Limited.

Honours 
In August 1991, Lalor was awarded the Efficiency Decoration (Territorial) and the associated post-nominal letters TD. In April 2002, he was awarded the Volunteer Reserves Service Medal. In the 2010 New Year Honours, he was appointed Companion of the Order of the Bath (CB).

He was appointed Honorary Colonel of The Honourable Artillery Company on 1 October 1996. His tenure ended on 1 July 1999. On 1 May 2010, he was appointed Honorary Colonel Commandant of the Royal Regiment of Artillery.

References 

British Army major generals
Army Reserve (United Kingdom)
Companions of the Order of the Bath
Queen's Regiment officers
Graduates of the Royal Military Academy Sandhurst
Honourable Artillery Company officers
1956 births
Living people